Supattra Pairoj (born 27 June 1990) is a Thai indoor volleyball player. She is a current member of the Thailand women's national volleyball team.

Clubs
  Supreme Chonburi (2010–present)

Awards

Individuals 
 2016–17 Thailand League – "Best Libero"
 2017–18 Thailand League – "Best Libero"

Clubs
 2011–12 Thailand League –  Runner-up, with Supreme Nakhon Si
 2015–16 Thailand League –  Runner-up, with Supreme Nakhonsi
 2016–17 Thailand League –  Champion, with Supreme Chonburi
 2017 Thai–Denmark Super League -  Champion, with Supreme Chonburi
 2017–18 Thailand League –  Champion, with Supreme Chonburi
 2018 Thai–Denmark Super League –  Champion, with Supreme Chonburi
 2018–19 Thailand League –  Runner-up, with Supreme Chonburi
 2019 Thai–Denmark Super League –  Champion, with Supreme Chonburi
 2017 Asian Club Championship –  Champion, with Supreme Chonburi
 2018 Asian Club Championship –  Champion, with Supreme Chonburi
 2019 Asian Club Championship –  Runner-up, with Supreme Chonburi
 2020 Thailand League –  Champion, with Supreme Chonburi

References

External links
 FIVB Biography

1990 births
Living people
Supattra Pairoj
Supattra Pairoj
Supattra Pairoj
Supattra Pairoj
Volleyball players at the 2018 Asian Games
Supattra Pairoj
Southeast Asian Games medalists in volleyball
Supattra Pairoj
Asian Games medalists in volleyball
Medalists at the 2018 Asian Games
Competitors at the 2017 Southeast Asian Games
Competitors at the 2021 Southeast Asian Games
Liberos
Supattra Pairoj
Supattra Pairoj